Sicheng is a town in and the seat of Lingyun County, in the west of Guangxi, China.

Towns of Guangxi
Administrative divisions of Lingyun County